General North may refer to:

Gary L. North (born 1954), U.S. Air Force four-star general
Kenneth North (1930–2010), U.S. Air Force brigadier general
William North (1755–1836), U.S. Army brigadier general
William North, 6th Baron North (1678–1734), British Army lieutenant general and Spanish Army general